The Dayton View Historic District is a  sector of Dayton, Ohio, United States, developed in the late 19th century and consisting of 219 structures, that is listed on the National Register of Historic Places.

Historic district
In 1984, Dayton View was registered on the National Register of Historic Places, Broadway, Harvard Blvd., Superior and Salem Aves.  (No. 84003787). City of Dayton Ordinance #25552.

History
The area's style and layout should be credited to the vision of James Oliver Arnold, whose farm house still stands at the northwest corner of Superior and Arnold. The original portion of the farmhouse dates to 1832. James Arnold envisioned a grand neighborhood of broad, tree-lined streets graced with large, impressive homes set back comfortably from the street. Reforestation efforts following the loss of Arnold's distinctive elm trees are reviving Arnold's dream. Dayton View was historically one of Dayton's most prominent neighborhoods.

Architecture 
Dayton View includes houses of many architectural styles, such as Victorian, Jacobethan, Chateauesque, American Foursquare, and Prairie School architecture. The timeline of the architecture style is dated from the late 1880s through the 1930s. Dayton View, however, is listed on the National Register for Late Victorian and Colonial Revival styles.

Dayton View is home to large, architecturally significant homes with elaborate staircases, third-story ballrooms, and carriage houses.  The neighborhood is anchored by many of Dayton's most historically significant cultural institutions, as well as Dayton's most historically prominent churches, temples and synagogues (most of which line Salem Avenue). Today, Dayton View, once known for its richness of socioeconomic and cultural diversity, is largely an African-American community, and many of the synagogues and temples have been closed or taken over by other faiths.

See also
 National Register of Historic Places listings in Dayton, Ohio

References

External links
 Dayton View Historic District Official Website
 Dayton Metro Library, Dayton View Branch
 Preservation Dayton
 City of Dayton Official Website

Dayton View
Historic districts on the National Register of Historic Places in Ohio
National Register of Historic Places in Montgomery County, Ohio